Jon Gudmand Lange (born March 28, 1980 in Søborg) is a Danish actor. Jon Lange is the son of public school teachers Gerd Lange and Troels Gudmand Pedersen. He is the brother of television organizer Camille Lange. In 2013, he married Mette Marie Lei Lange, and in 2014 they welcomed twins. He is a graduate of The Acting School at Odense Theatre in 2011.

Filmography 
 Midsommer (2003)
 Unge Andersen' (2005)
 Allegro (2005)
 Den Sorte Madonna (2007)
 Kollegiet (2007)
 Broderskab (2010)
 Alle for en (2011)
 Sommeren '92 (2015)
 Domino'' (2019)

External links 
 
 

Danish male film actors
1980 births
Living people
People from Gladsaxe Municipality